Sofiia Matsiievska (born 3 September 2004) is a Ukrainian synchronised swimmer. She is a two-time World champion and two-time European champion. She represents Kharkiv Oblast.

References

External links
 Matsiievska's profile at the FINA website

2004 births
Living people
Ukrainian synchronized swimmers
World Aquatics Championships medalists in synchronised swimming
European Aquatics Championships medalists in synchronised swimming
21st-century Ukrainian women